3C 273 is a quasar located at the center of a giant elliptical galaxy in the constellation of Virgo. It was the first quasar ever to be identified and is the visually brightest quasar in the sky as seen from Earth, with an apparent visual magnitude of 12.9. The mass of its central supermassive black hole is approximately 886 million times the mass of the Sun.

Observation 
3C 273 is visible from March to July in both the northern and southern hemispheres. Situated in the Virgo constellation, it is bright enough to be observed with larger amateur telescopes. Due in part to its radio luminosity and its discovery as the first identified quasar, 3C 273's right ascension in the Fifth Fundamental Catalog (FK5) is used to standardize the positions of 23 extragalactic radio sources used to define the International Celestial Reference System (ICRS).

Given its distance from Earth and visual magnitude, 3C 273 is the most distant celestial object average amateur astronomers are likely to see through their telescopes.

Properties

This is the optically brightest quasar in the sky from Earth with an apparent visual magnitude of ~12.9, and one of the closest with a redshift, z, of 0.158. A luminosity distance of DL =  may be calculated from z. Using parallax methods with the Very Large Telescope interferometer yields a distance estimate of  ().

It is one of the most luminous quasars known, with an absolute magnitude of −26.7, meaning that if it were only as distant as Pollux (~10 parsecs) it would appear nearly as bright in the sky as the Sun. Since the Sun's absolute magnitude is 4.83, it means that the quasar is over 4 trillion times more luminous than the Sun at visible wavelengths.

The luminosity of 3C 273 is variable at nearly every wavelength from radio waves to gamma rays on timescales of a few days to decades. Polarization with coincident orientation has been observed in radio, infrared, and optical light being emitted from a large-scale jet; these emissions are therefore almost certainly synchrotron in nature. The radiation is created by a jet of charged particles moving at relativistic speeds. VLBI radio observations of 3C 273 have revealed proper motion of some of the radio emitting regions, further suggesting the presence of relativistic jets of material.

This is a prototype of an Active Galactic Nucleus, demonstrating that the energy is being produced through accretion by a supermassive black hole (SMBH). No other astrophysical source can produce the observed energy. The mass of its central SMBH has been measured to be  million solar masses through broad emission-line reverberation mapping.

Large-scale jet
The quasar has a large-scale visible jet, which measures ~ long, having an apparent size of 23″. Such jets are believed to be created by the interaction of the central black hole and the accretion disk. In 1995, optical imaging of the jet using the Hubble Space Telescope revealed a structured morphology evidenced by repeated bright knots interlaced by areas of weak emission. The viewing angle of the jet is about 6° as seen from Earth. The jet was observed to abruptly change direction by an intrinsic angle of 2° in 2003, which is larger than the jet's intrinsic opening angle of 1.1°. An expanding cocoon of heated gas is being generated by the jet, which may be impacting an inclined disk of gas within the central .

Host galaxy
3C 273 lies at the center of a giant elliptical galaxy with an apparent magnitude of 16 and an apparent size of 29 arcseconds. The morphological classification of the host galaxy is E4, indicating a moderately flattened elliptical shape.

History
The name signifies that it was the 273rd object (ordered by right ascension) of the Third Cambridge Catalog of Radio Sources (3C), published in 1959. After accurate positions were obtained using lunar occultation by Cyril Hazard at the Parkes Radio Telescope, the radio source was quickly associated with an optical counterpart, an unresolved stellar object. In 1963, Maarten Schmidt and Bev Oke published a pair of papers in Nature reporting that 3C 273 has a substantial redshift of 0.158, placing it several billion light-years away.

Prior to the discovery of 3C 273, several other radio sources had been associated with optical counterparts, the first being 3C 48. Also, many active galaxies had been misidentified as variable stars, including the famous BL Lac, W Com and AU CVn. However, it was not understood what these objects were, since their spectra were unlike those of any known stars. Its spectrum did not resemble that of any normal stars with typical stellar elements. 3C 273 was the first object to be identified as a quasar—an extremely luminous object at an astronomical distance.

3C 273 is a radio-loud quasar, and was also one of the first extragalactic X-ray sources discovered in 1970.
However, even to this day, the process which gives rise to the X-ray emissions is controversial.

See also
List of quasars

References

External links 
 3C 273's Database at the INTEGRAL Science Data Centre (ESA)
 Detailed CCD image of 3C 273 based on 30 min total exposure
 Amateur 3C 273 Redshift Measurement
 NightSkyInfo.com – 3C 273
  SKY-MAP.ORG SDSS image of 3C 273
 The Quasar 3C 273: Spring 2005 – Variable Star Of The Season AAVSO
 

Virgo (constellation)
OVV quasars
273